Song Jae-ung (born 2 April 1945) is a South Korean diver. He competed at the 1964 Summer Olympics and the 1968 Summer Olympics.

References

1945 births
Living people
South Korean male divers
Olympic divers of South Korea
Divers at the 1964 Summer Olympics
Divers at the 1968 Summer Olympics
Sportspeople from Seoul
Asian Games medalists in diving
Divers at the 1966 Asian Games
Divers at the 1970 Asian Games
Medalists at the 1966 Asian Games
Medalists at the 1970 Asian Games
Asian Games gold medalists for South Korea
Asian Games bronze medalists for South Korea
20th-century South Korean people